Tow Hill, also known by its Haida language name Taaw Tldáaw, is a large isolated volcanic plug located  east of Masset on the north end of the Naikoon Peninsula of northeast Graham Island in Haida Gwaii, British Columbia, Canada, east of McIntyre Bay and near the mouth of the Hiellen River, which is the site of Hiellen, a now-abandoned Haida village and of the Hiellen Indian Reserve No. 2, on the site of that village.  Formerly Tow Hill Provincial Park, it is now part of Naikoon Provincial Park, which covers most of the northeastern flatland of Graham Island.

Tow Hill is associated by the editors Canadian Mountain Encyclopedia with the Queen Charlotte Mountains which in turn form part of the Insular Mountains,  but it is not physically part of the range, and is separated from mountainous parts of Graham Island by expanses of forested flatland-marsh and is properly designated as being on the Argonaut Plain, one of the lowland areas of Haida Gwaii not in the Queen Charlotte Mountains.

Tow Hill consists of faceted columnar-jointed basalt columns that solidified about two million years ago during the Pleistocene epoch.

"This feature is an eroded volcanic plug - the most distinctive navigational landmark on the entire North Beach. Tow is derived from a Haida word that rhymes with "cow", and means place of food. Many legends about its origin and the significance of the blowhole at the base of the hill......"

See also
 Volcanism in Canada
 List of volcanoes in Canada

References

Volcanic plugs of British Columbia
Mountains of British Columbia under 1000 metres
Graham Island
Pleistocene volcanoes